Cliff Gorman (born Joel Joshua Goldberg; October 13, 1936 – September 5, 2002) was an American stage and screen actor. He won an Obie award in 1968 for the stage presentation of The Boys in the Band, and went on to reprise his role in the 1970 film version.

Life and career
Gorman was born Joel Joshua Goldberg in Queens, New York, the son of Jewish parents, Ethel (née Kaplan) and Samuel Goldberg, who later changed their surname to Gorman.  He attended The High School of Music & Art in Manhattan.

Gorman won a Tony Award in 1972 for playing Lenny Bruce in the play Lenny. Although the film version, directed by Bob Fosse, featured Dustin Hoffman, Gorman was recruited to portray a Dustin Hoffman-like character portraying Lenny Bruce, in a side-story in Fosse's autobiographical film All That Jazz (1979).

He played Joseph Goebbels in the 1981 TV movie The Bunker, and co-starred as Lt. Andrews in the film Angel (1984). He had roles in the movies Cops and Robbers (1973), Rosebud (1975), Brinks: The Great Robbery (1976), An Unmarried Woman (1978) with Jill Clayburgh, Night of the Juggler (1980), Hoffa (1992) with Jack Nicholson and Danny DeVito, and Night and the City (1992). His TV work included performances in the series Law and Order, Murder, She Wrote, Friday the 13th: the Series, and the 1970s drama Police Story, written by former LAPD Detective Sergeant Joseph Wambaugh.

On the September 13, 1965 episode of To Tell The Truth, Gorman sat in seat #1 as an imposter for game #3 of the evening. He received two votes, one from Orson Bean, and one from Kitty Carlisle. When asked what he actually did for a living, he responded that he sold room air conditioners for the Republic Water Heater Company.

Personal life
Gorman and his wife cared for his fellow The Boys in the Band cast member Robert La Tourneaux in the last few months of his battle against AIDS, until La Tourneaux's death on June 3, 1986.

Death
 
Gorman died of leukemia in 2002, aged 65, although his final film, Kill the Poor, was not released until 2003. He was survived by his wife, Gayle Gorman.

Filmography

References

External links

1936 births
2002 deaths
Male actors from New York City
American male film actors
American male stage actors
American male television actors
Jewish American male actors
Deaths from cancer in New York (state)
Deaths from leukemia
Obie Award recipients
Tony Award winners
The High School of Music & Art alumni
20th-century American male actors
20th-century American Jews
21st-century American Jews